Desmond Vamplew (born 20 August 1955) is a sport shooter from Canada. He won the gold medal in the men's/open fullbore rifle event at the 1978 Commonwealth Games in Edmonton, and the silver medal in the Queen's Prize fullbore rifle pairs event (with James Paton) at the 2014 Commonwealth Games in Glasgow.

References

1955 births
Living people
Sportspeople from Toronto
Canadian male sport shooters
Shooters at the 1978 Commonwealth Games
Shooters at the 2014 Commonwealth Games
Commonwealth Games gold medallists for Canada
Commonwealth Games silver medallists for Canada
Commonwealth Games medallists in shooting
Medallists at the 1978 Commonwealth Games